Zhengzhou BRT Route B2 is a bus rapid transit route operated by Zhengzhou Bus. It is the 2nd route with dedicated bus lanes in Zhengzhou BRT.

History
The route was commenced on 26 January 2014, operating on Changchun Road, Lianhua Street, Ruida Road, Huagong Road, Rantun Road and Nongye Road.

Due to the construction of Nongye Expressway, the route was diverted from Nongye Road to Dongfeng Road on 21 July 2015. After the completion of Nongye Expressway with new island platforms under the elevated highway, the east section of the route returned to Nongye Road on 26 May 2017.

In 2019, trolleybus overheads have been installed under the Nongye Elevated for conversion of B2 to an eBRT corridor, marking the return of trolleybuses to Zhengzhou.

Route

The west terminus of the route is Daxie bus terminus in the high-tech zone in northwestern Zhengzhou, and the east terminus is Zhongzhou Avenue and Nongye Road station near Zhengdong New Area.

Branch routes
The route has a number of branch routes, which are free-interchangeable with the main route.

B11: Heizhuang (Zhongzhou Avenue) ↔ Huanggang Temple
B12: Zhengzhou railway station (North Terminus) ↔ Lamei Road B/T
B18: Gaocun (Wenhua Road) ↔ Minsheng E. Street and Zhengguang Road
B20: Zhengzhou railway station (North Terminus) ↔ Liuzhuang (Huayuan Road)
B27: Xushuihe E. Road and Jinju Street ↔ Dongqing Street
B28: Duying Street and Hongsong Road ↔ Hehuan Street
B32: Kexue Avenue B/T ↔ Zijingshan (Huayuan Road)
B35: Daxie B/T ↔ Zhengzhou Central Hospital
B51: Kaiyuan Road B/T ↔ Wulongkou B/T
B53: Zhengzhou Bus Company ↔ Wenhua Road and Sanquan Road (N)
B66: North 3rd Ring Road and Nanyang Road ↔ Jinhe Park
B67: Zizhu Road B/T ↔ Dianchang Road B/T

Fleet
Yutong ZK6180HGC (18m, former)
Yutong ZK6180CHEVG1 (18m, former)
Yutong ZK6180CHEVNPG3 (18m)
Yutong E12 (12m)
Yutong ZK6125CHEVNPG4 (12m)

References

Bus Routes in Zhengzhou
Zhengzhou BRT